Passing Glory is a 1999 basketball-drama film produced for TNT, written by Harold Sylvester, and directed by Steve James. It is based on a true story.

This movie stars Andre Braugher, Rip Torn, and Sean Squire, and features a speaking role by Arthur Agee, subject of the documentary Hoop Dreams, also directed by Steve James. The music was composed by Stephen James Taylor.

Plot
An angry black Josephite priest (Andre Braugher) in 1960s New Orleans goes against the wishes of his parish leader (Rip Torn) as he pushes a basketball game between his unbeaten all-black team and an undefeated all-white prep school team.
This is based on the true story of the first integrated basketball game in the history of New Orleans. The plot follows the events leading up to the game between the Josephites' all-black St. Augustine High School and all-white Jesuit High. It focuses on the struggles that Father Joseph Verrett had in trying to pull the game off and trying to earn respect for his team.

Hired as a history teacher, Father Perry will not let the athletes in his classes be given the special treatment that they've been used to. "I teach history," he informs the headmaster when asked to take over the suddenly vacant position of basketball coach. "I believe sports are overemphasized." Moreover, coming from the North, he can't understand why star black athletes don't go to the best white colleges, as they should. "Down here, 'should' and 'is' is a long ways apart," the dad of the team's star informs him.
The film includes many tangible examples of the racism then present. The blacks have to go to a separate "coloreds only" line at fast food outlets, and ordering a meal in the wrong place can and does get you thrown in jail.

Cast
 Andre Braugher as Father Joseph Verrett
 Rip Torn as Father Robert Grant
 Sean Squire as Travis Porter
 Ruby Dee as Mommit Porter
 Bill Nunn as Howard Porter
 Daniel Hugh Kelly as Mike Malone Sr.
 Tony Colitti as Chick Viola
 Shawn Wright as Jerry Singer

References

External links
 
 "Reverend passes glory to real hero" article in Baltimore Sun, by John Rivera, February 20, 1999 (about film based on facts and use of "artistic license")

1999 films
1999 drama films
American basketball films
American independent films
American teen films
Films about race and ethnicity
Films about racism
Films directed by Steve James
Films scored by Stephen James Taylor
Films set in Louisiana
Films set in the 1960s
Films shot in Georgia (U.S. state)
American sports drama films
Sports films based on actual events
African-American Roman Catholicism
Society of St. Joseph of the Sacred Heart
1990s English-language films
1990s American films